Lieutenant George Edgar Bruce Lawson was a South African World War I flying ace credited with six aerial victories.

Early life
Lawson was  born on 26 April 1899 in Cape Town, Cape Colony. After the Union of South Africa was formed the family travelled by train and then by ox wagon to Johannesburg.

World War I

Lawson was assigned to 32 Squadron in April 1918. He scored his first victory on 7 June 1918, driving down an Albatros D.V while flying Royal Aircraft Factory SE5a No. C1881. He then used No. E1399 to drive down two Fokker D.VIIs and destroy three others during September 1918. The last of those triumphs, his second of 27 September, resulted in the death in action of noted German ace Fritz Rumey of Jagdstaffel 5. Lawson and Rumey collided in midair. Rumey bailed out, but his parachute failed to open. Lawson nursed his crippled plane back to the British lines. He was later awarded the Distinguished Flying Cross. The citation read:

Postwar
Lawson joined the South African Air Force in 1922. He was killed in an accident on 19 November 1922 while riding as a passenger in an Airco DH.9.

Notes

References
Above the Trenches: a Complete Record of the Fighter Aces and Units of the British Empire Air Forces 1915-1920. Christopher F. Shores, Norman L. R. Franks, Russell Guest. Grub Street, 1990. , .
 Medals

1922 deaths
Recipients of the Distinguished Flying Cross (United Kingdom)
South African aviators
1899 births
South African World War I flying aces
Military personnel from Cape Town
Royal Air Force personnel of World War I
Victims of aviation accidents or incidents in 1922
Victims of aviation accidents or incidents in South Africa